WTA 250 tournaments is a category of tennis tournaments in the Women's Tennis Association tour, implemented since the reorganization of the schedule in 2021. Earlier these events were classified as WTA International Tournaments.

As of 2021, WTA 250 tournaments include events with prize money of approximately $250,000.

The ranking points awarded to the winners of these tournaments are 280.

This compares to 2,000 points for winning a Grand Slam tournament ("major"), up to 1,500 points for winning the WTA Finals, 1000 points for winning a WTA 1000 tournament, and 470 for winning a WTA 500 tournament. This system differs slightly from that used for the men's ATP Tour, which has ATP Tour 250 events with 250 points for the winner (similar to WTA 250 tournaments), and two higher tiers of ATP tournaments offer 1000 and 500 points for winning, respectively.

Events

Historic names

1990–2008
WTA Tier III / IV / V

2009–2020
WTA International

2021–present
WTA 250

Singles champions

WTA International

WTA 250

Statistics

Most titles 

Bold face designates active players

Notes

See also
 WTA Tour
 WTA 1000 tournaments
 WTA 500 tournaments
 WTA 125 tournaments
 ITF Women's World Tennis Tour
 WTA International tournaments
 ATP Tour 250

References